Johann II (Johann Maria Franz Placidus; 5 October 1840 – 11 February 1929), nicknamed the Good, was Prince of Liechtenstein from 12 November 1858 until his death in 1929. His reign of 70 years and 91 days is the third-longest of any sovereign monarch in European history, after those of King Louis XIV and Queen Elizabeth II respectively, and fourth-longest overall (for which exact dates are known) after King Louis XIV, Queen Elizabeth II, and King Bhumibol Adulyadej respectively.

Early life
Johann II was the elder son of Aloys II, Prince of Liechtenstein and Countess Franziska Kinsky of Wchinitz and Tettau. He ascended to the throne shortly after his 18th birthday. Until he was surpassed by Elizabeth II on 9 May 2022, his reign had been the longest precisely documented tenure of any European monarch since antiquity in which a regent (that is, a regent serving in place of an underage sovereign) was never employed. Although his mother acted as his regent from 10 February 1859 to November 1860, she was not the regent for a minor, but was appointed by her son to fulfill his duties because he wished to finish his education before he began his rule.

Law and reform
In 1862, Johann II issued Liechtenstein's first constitution. After World War I, Johann II granted a new constitution in 1921. It granted considerable political rights to common Liechtensteiners and made the principality a constitutional monarchy. The constitution has survived but with revisions, most notably in 2003.

Liechtenstein left the German Confederation in 1866. Not long afterward, the Liechtenstein Army was abolished as it was regarded as an unnecessary expense.

Foreign affairs
Johann II somewhat cooled relations with Liechtenstein's traditional ally, Austria-Hungary and its successor states, to forge closer relations with Switzerland, particularly after World War I. Liechtenstein was neutral during the war, which broke Liechtenstein's alliance with Austria-Hungary and led it to go into a customs union with Switzerland. In 1924, late in Johann's reign, the Swiss franc became Liechtenstein's official currency.

Patron of arts

Johann II added much to the Liechtenstein Princely Collections. Although considered a prominent patron of the arts and sciences during his long reign, Johann II was also considered to be rather unsociable and did not participate in social events. He never married or had any children, like several other members of his family.

Between 1905 and 1920, Schloss Vaduz was renovated and expanded. Prince Johann II did not live in the castle or even in Liechtenstein, but his successors made the castle the princely residence in 1938. 

Upon his death in 1929, Johann II was succeeded by his brother Franz I.

Honours
  Grand Cross of the Royal Guelphic Order, 1860 (Kingdom of Hanover)
  Knight of the Golden Fleece, 1862 (Austrian Empire)
  Grand Cross of St. Stephen, 1896 (Austria-Hungary)
  Knight of St. Hubert, 1882 (Kingdom of Bavaria)
  Bailiff Grand Cross of Honour and Devotion (Sovereign Military Order of Malta)

References

External links 
 
 Princely House of Liechtenstein

1840 births
1929 deaths
Princes of Liechtenstein
People from Břeclav District
Burials in the Czech Republic
Knights of the Golden Fleece of Austria
Grand Crosses of the Order of Saint Stephen of Hungary
19th-century Liechtenstein people